Pär Karlsson (born 29 May 1978 in Sweden) is a Swedish retired footballer who now works as a scout and manager.

Career

Karlsson started his senior career with KB Karlskoga in 1994. In 2000, he signed for Wimbledon in the English Football League First Division, where he made 32 appearances and scored one goal. After that, he played for Swedish club IF Elfsborg before retiring in 2003.

References

External links  
 A talented pro Par excellence! 
 Soccerbase Profile
 svenskfotboll.se Profile 
 The Historical Don Profile

Association football midfielders
Wimbledon F.C. players
Expatriate footballers in England
Swedish footballers
Swedish expatriate footballers
IF Elfsborg players
IFK Göteborg players
1978 births
Living people